Diphenyl oxalate (trademark name Cyalume) is a solid whose oxidation products are responsible for the chemiluminescence in a glowstick. This chemical is the double ester of phenol with oxalic acid. Upon reaction with hydrogen peroxide, 1,2-dioxetanedione is formed, along with release of the two phenols. The dioxetanedione then reacts with a dye molecule, decomposing to form carbon dioxide and leaving the dye in an excited state. As the dye relaxes back to its unexcited state, it releases a photon of visible light.

The reaction rate is pH dependent, and slightly alkaline conditions, achieved by adding a weak base, such as sodium salicylate, give a faster reaction and therefore produce brighter light.
The 2,4,6-trichlorophenol ester is a solid and thus easier to handle. Furthermore, since trichlorophenolate is the better leaving group, the reaction will proceed faster, again producing brighter light, as compared to the phenol ester.

The following colors can be produced by using different dyes:

References

Oxalate esters
Chemiluminescence
Phenol esters